Paracanthoisis is a genus of deep-sea bamboo coral within the family Isididae.

References

Isididae
Octocorallia genera